Sharon Tsukamoto (born 10 August 1953) is a Canadian gymnast. She competed at the 1972 Summer Olympics.

References

External links
 

1953 births
Living people
Canadian female artistic gymnasts
Olympic gymnasts of Canada
Gymnasts at the 1972 Summer Olympics
Gymnasts from Toronto